Micro-teaching is a teacher training and faculty development technique whereby the teacher reviews a recording of a teaching session, in order to get constructive feedback from peers and/or students about what has worked and what improvements can be made to their teaching technique. Micro-teaching was invented in 1963 at Stanford University by Dwight W. Allen, and has subsequently been used to develop educators in all forms of education.

In the original process, a teacher was asked to prepare a short lesson (usually 20 minutes) for a small group of learners who may not have been his/her own students. This was then recorded on video. After the lesson, the teacher, teaching colleagues, a master teacher and the students together viewed the videotape and commented on what they saw happening, referencing the teacher's teaching objectives. Watching the video and getting comments from colleagues and students provide teachers with an often intense "under the microscope" view of their teaching.

A review of the evidence for micro-teaching, undertaken by John Hattie as part of his Visible Learning project, found it was the 6th most effective method for improving student outcomes.

Introductions
Microteaching is a technique aiming to prepare teacher candidates to the real classroom setting (Brent & Thomson, 1996). Microteaching can also defined as a teaching technique especially used in teachers’ pre-service education to train them systematically by allowing them to experiment main teacher behaviors.  By the help of this technique, teacher candidates can experiment and learn each of the teaching skills by breaking them into smaller parts and without encountering chaotic environment of the crowded classes. While instilling teaching skills in students during microteaching, reciprocal negotiation of the students actively presenting and watching about the performances can make great contribution to the acquisition of the skills (Taşdemir, 2006). Wilkinson (1996), emphasizes that teacher candidates can experience real teaching and teaching rules with the help of this method. This method offers teachers opportunities for discovering and reflecting on both their own and others’ teaching styles and enables them to learn about new teaching techniques (Wahba, 1999). Pre-service teacher can benefit to a great extent from microteaching applications. Firstly, they reveal teaching facts; and roles of the teacher (Amobi, 2005; Hawkey, 1995; Kpanja, 2001; Wilkinson, 1996); help pre-service teachers to see the importance of planning and taking decisions (Gess-Newsome & Lederman, 1990); enable them to develop and improve their teaching skills (Benton-Kupper, 2001).

Microteaching technique is an application in which video recordings have been made possible as a result of developing technology. Audio and visual technology is an effective and reflective tool in preparing pre-service teachers to the profession of teaching. Video recordings provide pre-service teachers with the chance of evaluating themselves by engaging them in more experiences and configurations (Jensen et al., 1994). Sherin (2000) indicates that video recordings affect the perspectives of teachers in education process. Cunningham & Benedetto (2002) emphasize that video tools support the reflective learning, and Spurgeon & Bowen (2002) stress that by the help of these tools, the problems that may occur in education process can be observed and defined. Farris (1991) states that this method increases the confidence and raises the awareness of personal skills. Selçuk (2001) indicates that video recordings can not only be used for demonstrating model teacher behaviours but can also be used for the analysis of microteaching. Using video recording method in microteaching applications contributes to the professional development of pre-service teachers by identifying strengths and weaknesses and improves their competencies (Tok, 2007).

Techniques
Since its inception in 1963, micro-teaching has become an established teacher-training procedure in many universities and school districts.  This training procedure is geared towards simplification of the complexities of the regular teaching-learning process.  Class size, time, task, and content are scaled down to provide optimal training environments.
The supervisor demonstrates the skill to be practiced. This may be live demonstration, or a video presentation of the skill.
Then, the group members select a topic and prepare a lesson of five to ten minutes.
The teacher trainee then has the opportunity to practice and evaluate his use of the skills. Practice takes the form of a ten-minute micro-teaching session in which five to ten pupils are involved.

In more recent years, the easy availability of recording equipment and the use of social media for dissemination have made micro-teaching more accessible.

Feedback
Feedback in micro-teaching is critical for teacher-trainee improvement.  It is the information that a student receives concerning their attempts to imitate certain patterns of teaching. The built-in feedback mechanism in micro-teaching acquaints the trainee with the success of their performance and enables them to evaluate and to improve teaching.

See also
 Evidence-based education

References

External links
 Modular Teaching and Learning Solutions for a needs based education

Pedagogy